Hakea psilorrhyncha is a flowering plant in the family Proteacea, it is endemic to a small area on the west coast in the Wheatbelt and Mid West regions of Western Australia. It has needle-shaped, sharply pointed leaves and clusters of scented brownish yellow flowers.

Description
The branchlets and new leaf growth is a rusty colour. Flowering occurs from September to October.

Taxonomy and naming

Hakea psilorrhyncha was first formally described in 1990 by Robyn Mary Barker and the description was published in Flora of Australia. It was named from the Greek psilos (smooth) and rhynchos (snout) referring to the beak of the fruit.

Distribution and habitat
This hakea grows in mallee or open heath on deep sand, loam or clay from Geraldton and south to Moore River National Park.

Conservation status
Hakea psilorrhyncha is classified as "not threatened" by the Western Australian Government Department of Parks and Wildlife.

References

psilorrhyncha
Eudicots of Western Australia
Plants described in 1990
Taxa named by Robyn Mary Barker